Stefan Jonsson can refer to:

 Stefán Jónsson (handball) (born 1944), Icelandic handball player
 Stefán Jónsson (water polo) (born 1918), Icelandic water polo player
 Stefan Jonsson (weightlifter) (born 1956), Icelandic weightlifter